The 2022–23 Clarkson Golden Knights Men's ice hockey season is the 101st season of play for the program. They represent Clarkson University in the 2022–23 NCAA Division I men's ice hockey season and for the 62nd season in the ECAC Hockey conference. The Golden Knights are coached by Casey Jones, in his 12th season, and play their home games at Cheel Arena.

Season
After missing out on the NCAA tournament for two consecutive seasons, Jones had to replace all three of his assistants going into the season.

Departures

Recruiting

Roster
As of August 24, 2022.

Standings

Schedule and results

|-
!colspan=12 style=";" | Exhibition

|-
!colspan=12 style=";" | Regular Season

|-
!colspan=12 style=";" | 

|-
!colspan=12 style=";" | Regular Season

|-
!colspan=12 style=";" |

Scoring statistics

Goaltending statistics

Rankings

References

2022-23
Clarkson Golden Knights
Clarkson Golden Knights
Clarkson Golden Knights
Clarkson Golden Knights